The Crown Colony of Sarawak was a British Crown colony on the island of Borneo, established in 1946, shortly after the dissolution of the British Military Administration. It was succeeded as the state of Sarawak through the formation of the Federation of Malaysia on 16 September 1963.

History

Cession
After the end of Japanese occupation in Sarawak on 11 September 1945, British Military Administration with John Fitzpatrick took over Sarawak for seven months before handing it back to Rajah Charles Vyner Brooke on 15 April 1946. Charles Vyner Brooke arrived in Sarawak on 15 April 1946 to receive the handover. He was generally well received by the Sarawak population. During the Japanese occupation, Sarawak had suffered a total loss of 23 million dollars (excluding 57 million in losses by Sarawak oil company) due to the destruction of oilfields, airstrips, and rubber plantations. Vyner Brooke found that he did not have enough resources to develop Sarawak. He did not have any male heir to inherit the position of White Rajah. Vyner Brooke also lacked confidence in the leadership abilities of Bertram Brooke (Vyner's brother) and Anthony Brooke (Bertram Brooke's son) to govern Sarawak. Vyner Brooke hoped that with the cession of Sarawak as a British crown colony, the British would be able to rebuild Sarawak's infrastructure and develop its postwar economy. The news of the cession of Sarawak first came to light on 8 February 1946; there was a mixed response from the Sarawak people. The Iban, the Chinese, and the Melanau community received the news positively. However, the majority of the Malays were against the cession of Sarawak to the British government. British representatives conducted a survey among the various ethnic groups in Sarawak regarding the cession issue. On 10 May 1946, a report was compiled and sent to the Colonial Office in London, which included the following:

However, according to ABC Radio Melbourne, Rajah Charles Vyner Brooke would receive £1 million in sterling as compensation for the cession of Sarawak. This gave an impression that Vyner was trying to sell Sarawak for personal gain – in contrast to the 1941 constitution of Sarawak which stated that Sarawak would head towards self-governance under Brooke's guidance. The constitution was not implemented due to the Japanese occupation. The proposed cession was also criticised by a local Malay newspaper, Utusan Sarawak, as the British had failed to protect Sarawak from Japanese invasion in 1942, only to try to claim Sarawak after the war. In addition, the British would only approve financial loans to rebuild Sarawak upon Sarawak's cession as a crown colony. The British claim on Sarawak was therefore seen as an effort to exploit the natural resources of Sarawak for their own economic interests. On top of this, the British Colonial Office had also tried to combine British Malaya, Straits Settlements, British North Borneo, Brunei, and Sarawak into one administrative unit. From 1870 until 1917, the British had tried to interfere with the internal affairs of Sarawak, but this was met with stiff resistance from Rajah Charles Brooke. The British also tried to interfere with the succession issue of Anthony Brooke in 1940, and had urged Vyner Brooke to sign a 1941 agreement to station a British advisor in Sarawak for fear of Japanese influence in Southeast Asia. The British also became wary that Australia intended to take over the military administration of Sarawak. Consequently, the British government wished to take control of Sarawak before the Australians did.

From 15 to 17 May 1946, the cession bill was debated in the Council Negri (now Sarawak State Legislative Assembly) and was approved with a slim majority of 19 to 16 votes. European officers were generally supportive of the cession, but the Malay officials strongly opposed the cession. About 300 to 400 Malay civil servants resigned from their posts in protest. Questions had been raised about the legality of such voting in Council Negri. Outsiders such as European officers took part in the voting that decided the fate of Sarawak. Several Chinese representatives were threatened with their lives if they did not vote to support the cession. The cession bill was signed on 18 May 1946 by Rajah Charles Vyner Brooke and the British representative, C.W. Dawson, at the Astana, Kuching; the cession of Sarawak as a British Crown Colony became effective on 1 July 1946. On the same day, Rajah Charles Vyner Brooke gave a speech on the benefits for Sarawak as a crown colony:

The first governor did not arrive until 29 October 1946. Sarawak was a British Crown Colony for 17 years before participating in the formation of Malaysia.

Anti-cession movement

The cession has sparked the nationalism spirit among the Malay intellectuals. They started anti-cession movement with their main centre of operation in Sibu and Kuching. Meanwhile, majority of the Chinese supported the cession because the British would bring more economic benefits to Sarawak. Besides, illegal gambling and opium trade will be banned under British rule which was also beneficial for the economy. The majority of the Iban people respected decision by the Rajah Charles Vyner Brooke as they believe that Rajah acted on the best interests of the Sarawak people. Meanwhile, the Indians in Sarawak also supported the cession as they viewed the British governing principle as satisfactory.

The Malays established the Malay Youth Association (Malay: Persatuan Pemuda Melayu (PSM)) in Sibu and Sarawak Malay National Association (Malay:Persatuan Kebangsaan Melayu Sarawak (PKMS)) in Kuching. Those civil servants who resigned from their government posts established a group called "Group 338" as to symbolise prophet Muhammad that led 338 infantry to victory in the Battle of Badr. Initially they organised talks, hanging posters, signing memorandums, and took part in demonstrations in order to express their dissatisfaction over the cession. Anthony Brooke also tried to oppose the cession but he was banned from entering Sarawak by the British colonial government. The demands and appeals by the Malay community was not heeded by the British. This has caused a more radical organisation to be established in Sibu on 20 August 1948, known as Rukun 13, with Awang Rambli as their leader. In Awang Rambli's opinion:

Thus, the second governor of Sarawak, Duncan Stewart was stabbed by Rosli Dhobi in Sibu on 3 December 1949. Following this, Rukun 13 was outlawed with four members (including Rosli Dhobi and Awang Rambli) of the organisation hanged to death and the others jailed. This incident increased the British effort to clamp down on the anti-cession movement of Sarawak. All the organisations related to anti-cession were banned and anti-cession documents were seized. Following the incident, Anthony Brooke tried to distance himself from the anti-cession movement for fear of being associated with the plotting to kill the governor of Sarawak. The people of Sarawak were also afraid to lend support to the anti-cession movement for fear of backlash from the British colonial government. This led to the end of anti-cession movement in February 1951. Although the anti-cession movement ended as a failure, Malaysian historians regarded this incident as a starting point of nationalism among the natives in Sarawak. This incident also sent the British a message that the local people of Sarawak should not be taken lightly. The British had described the members of Rukun 13 as traitors but in the eyes of Malaysian historians, the Rukun 13 members are regarded as heroes that fight for the independence of Sarawak.

On 4 February 1951, various anti-cession organisations in Sarawak sent a telegram to the British prime minister on plans on the future of Sarawak. They received a reply from the British prime minister which assured them of the British intentions to guide Sarawak towards self-governance in the Commonwealth of Nations. The people of Sarawak are free to express their views through proper channels according to the constitution, and their opinions will be given full consideration by the British government.

Administration 
The governor of British Crown Colony of Sarawak (Malay: Tuan Yang Terutama Gabenor Koloni Mahkota British Sarawak) was a position created by the British Government upon the cession of Sarawak by the Brooke Administration in 1946. The appointment was made by King George VI, and later by Queen Elizabeth II until the formation of the Federation of Malaysia in 1963. After the formation of Malaysia, the title was changed to 'Governor of the state of Sarawak' and the appointment was later made by the Yang di-Pertuan Agong or King of Malaysia. The official residence of the governor of Sarawak at that time was The Astana, located on the north bank of the Sarawak River.

Sarawak was perhaps unique among Crown colonies in that pre-existing institutions of government were continued under the new regime. The Supreme Council and Council Negri, established under the Brookes' 1941 constitution, retained their prerogatives with the rajah being replaced by a governor. Even so, these bodies were entirely appointed. In 1954, the Council Negri had legislative and financial authority and consisted of 25 members: 14 officials from the civil service, and 11 unofficials representing various ethnic and interest groups. In exercising his powers, the governor was required to consult with the Supreme Council.

In terms of local government, the territory was divided into five divisions each overseen by a resident. Each division was sub-divided into districts overseen by district officers, and these were further divided into sub-districts. Each division and district had an advisory council and districts sometimes also had a Chinese Advisory Board. The government also began constructing a system of local authorities before the war and by 1954 about 260,000 people were living in incorporated areas. While early local authorities were race-based, this was found to be an unworkable system and local authorities were soon integrated.

In 1956, the constitution was reformed to increase democratic representation. The Council Negri was enlarged to 45 members, of which 24 were elected unofficials, 14 were ex-officio, and 4 were appointed to represent interests considered insufficiently represented by the governor. The new Supreme Council consisted of three ex-officio members (the Chief Secretary, the Financial Secretary and the Attorney-General), two appointed members, and five members elected from the Council Negri.

Economy
The economy of Sarawak was heavily dependent upon the agricultural sector and was heavily influenced by the government expenditure on the economy, and imports and exports of goods. Consumption and investments made up only a small part of the economy as majority of the population were working in the agricultural sector. The private and commercial economy in Sarawak was dominated by the Chinese although majority of the Chinese were into farming. The annual Sarawak budget can be divided into two parts: recurrent budget and capital budget. Recurrent budget was the annual commitment by the government for spending in public services. Its revenue is derived from regular, reliable source of income. Capital budget was used to long-term development in Sarawak. Its revenue was derived from unpredictable source of income such as grants from the British colonial development and welfare fund, loans, and surpluses from export duties. From 1947 to 1962, the total government revenue was increasing from 12 million to 78 million dollar yearly, with total expenditure increasing steadily from 10 million to 82 million dollars per year. There were only three years where the government budget showed deficits (1949, 1958, 1962). There was no known gross domestic product (GDP) figures during this period due to lack of data. Although several new tax and business legislations were introduced during the colonial period, however, there were few practising lawyers available. This was partly due to Brooke regime of not allowing lawyers to practice in Sarawak. Therefore, cases seldom reach the court level. Agriculture in Sarawak was poorly developed during the period due to the lack of education among farmers that used wasteful slash-and-burn technique in farming, lack of communications, and failure of diversification crops other than rubber.

After the Japanese occupation, Rajah Charles Vyner Brooke signed the last Supply Ordinance for the budget expenditure in Sarawak in 1946. The majority of expenditure went into "Arrears of Pension" (amounting to one million dollars), probably to pay for government servants who were held by or working during the Japanese occupation. This was followed by expenditure for the treasury, public works, pensions and provident fund, medical and health, and Sarawak Constabulary. Public works expenditure accounted for only 5.5% of the total expenditure even after the destruction of war during the Japanese occupation. Following the formation of British Crown Colony, public works and treasury became the immediate priority for the post war reconstruction and restructuring of government finances. This was followed closely by pensions, constabulary, and health. Public works remained as the major expenditure until 1950. In 1951, expenditures on aviation was specifically allocated as compared to previous years where this subject was put inside the "Landing grounds" expenditure. The 1951 budget put more emphasis on the allocations for local authorities, native affairs, defence, and internal security; overshadowed the expenditures on public works. In 1952, contributions for war damage commission was dramatically increased. In In 1953, allocation were increased for developmental projects. Only in 1956, expenditures for education was substantially increased, and accounted for 15.5% of the total budget in 1957. Expenses on education occupied a significant proportion on the budget until the end of the colonial period. Majority of the education expenditures was put  into primary and secondary schools. Tertiary education only started to appear in Sarawak in 1961 following the formation of Batu Lintang Teachers' Training College. Expenditures on forestry has also been increasing throughout the colonial period. Expenditures on defence has been minimal throughout the period because Britain was solely responsible for defence in Sarawak. The year 1952 also showed a jump in revenue from income tax although customs and excise duties still constituted the largest income earner for the government throughout the colonial period. However, revenues collected from income tax had been decreasing steadily throughout the colonial period.

Rice was the major import item in Sarawak. Although rice is grown in the state, it was not sufficient enough to feed the population since the Brooke era. Another major import was the oil from Seria oilfields for processing at Lutong oil refinery to produce gasoline, kerosene, gas, fuel oil, and diesel fuel. Major export items were: rubber, pepper, sago flour, Jelutong (a source of rubber), sawn timber, Copra seeds, and petroleum. There was only five rubber estates at that time covering only 2,854 hectares comparing to 80,000 hectares in small holdings. The years 1950 to 1952 showed an increase in government revenue due to the effects of Korean war that raised the demand for rubber. By 1956, pepper exports from Sarawak accounted for one third of the world's pepper production. The importance of Jelutong exports declined throughout the colonial area. Petroleum was the major income earner for Sarawak during this period. Initially, the colonial government exported gold to foreign markets but after 1959, government involvement in gold exports ceased, leaving miners to sell gold in the local and other free markets. Bauxite exports from the first division (Sematan) was increasing during the second half of the colonial period but by the end of the colonial period, this mineral was exhausted of its production.

Overall, the government expenditures during the colonial era has increased substantially in all sectors when compared to Brooke era. However, such amount is still lagging behind when compared to Malayan peninsular states. According to a research done by Alexander Gordon Crocker, such budget expenditures showed that the colonial government was trying to develop Sarawak instead of exploiting the natural resources in the state.

Demographics
A census conducted in 1947 shown that the population in Sarawak was 546,385 with Iban people, Chinese, and Malay made up 79.3% of the population. At the beginning of the colonial period, 72% of the population were subsistence farmers, 13% were growing cash crops and 15% were paid workers. Among the various ethnic groups in Sarawak, only the Chinese were closely associated with entrepreneurship.

Infrastructure

Education
The number of student enrollment increased steadily every year. In 1957, there were 79,407 students. A total of 70 primary schools were opened in 1957.

Batu Lintang Teacher Training Centre (BLTTC) was opened in 1948 in order to train teachers for rural native vernacular schools. English language training courses were offered to the teachers. A lower secondary school was also attached to BLTTC where the selected students from primary schools were enrolled. Students who successfully graduated from the secondary school was able to train as teacher at BLTTC or join the civil service. In order to raise the adult literacy in the rural areas and to improve the natives' agricultural productivity, Kanowit Rural Improvement School was opened in May 1948. However, due to apathy of the natives towards education, there was only slight improvement of literacy rate from 1947 to 1960. The Rural Improvement School was subsequently closed down in 1957.

Electricity
Immediately after the war, it was evident that Miri, Bintulu, and Limbang were devastated due to allied bombings during the war. The people of Miri were dependent upon a generator set brought by the Japanese from Jesselton (now Kota Kinabalu). Similarly, the towns of Kapit, Kanowit, and Song were destroyed in anarchy during the last days of war. Sarawak Electricity Supply Company (SESCo) was reinstated after the war, however it struggled to keep up with the growing demand of electricity in major townships due to lack of spare parts, constant wear and tear, and the lack of proper maintenance of the equipment. SESCo also took over the power plants at Miri from Sarawak Oil Fields Limited. The people from major towns continue to suffer from erratic supply of electricity until 1953 when electrical supply was restored to pre-war capacity. In that year, electrical supply was expanded to five new places in Sarawak. SESCo continued to operate until 1 January 1963, when it was turn into Sarawak Electricity Supply Corporation (SESCO).

Healthcare
Malaria was endemic in Sarawak. However, the first proper survey of malaria prevalence in Sarawak was only done from 1952 to 1953. The survey result found that the coastal areas had low malarial prevalence while the hilly and mountainous interior was prevalent with the malarial disease.

Medical services in Sarawak became part of the British Colonial Medical Service. Medical personnel had to be imported from Malayan Union (today known as Peninsular Malaysia). Sarawak Medical Department was established as a separate entity on 21 July 1947. The department's expenditure was about 10% of the government revenue. There was a shortage of manpower, including doctors, dressers (also known as hospital assistants), and nurses. By 1959, the staffing position had improved greatly. Divisional medical officers (equivalent to Chief Medical and Health Officers today) were appointed, and more nursing schools and rural dispensaries were opened. Various projects were started, such as a malaria control project (1953) and a tuberculosis control project (1960). Laws such as the Medical Registration Ordinance (1948), the Dentist Registration Ordinance (1948), the Dangerous Drugs Ordinance (1952), and the Public Health Ordinance (1963) were passed.

In 1947, there were only two government hospitals in Sarawak: Kuching General Hospital (now Sarawak General Hospital) (255 beds) and Sibu Lau King Howe Hospital (now Lau King Howe Hospital Memorial Museum) (55 beds). In Miri, a hospital was built by Sarawak Shell Oilfields Limited. There was an agreement with the government of Brunei to admit patients from Limbang into the Brunei State Hospital. There were regular monthly visits from Brunei Health Services to Limbang. In 1957, Sarawak Mental Hospital was constructed in Kuching. In 1952, a government hospital was constructed in Miri., followed by Christ Hospital built by American Methodists in Kapit in 1957, and Limbang Hospital in 1958. In 1947, there were 21 rural dispensaries attended by a dresser and an attendant. Kanowit dispensary and Saratok dispensary were opened in 1953 and 1960 respectively. The total annual workload of these dispensaries were 130,000 patients. In 1947, the colonial government allocated grant for the setting up of two rural dispensaries and 16 mobile dispensaries. However, due to the difficulty of recruiting the necessary manpower, only two mobile dispensaries were operational at the Rajang River to cater the needs of the rural communities.

The Japanese occupation had disrupted dental services in Sarawak. In 1949, an Australian dental surgeon was appointed to be in charge of dental services in Sarawak. British Council and Colombo Plan scholarships were set up to produce more dentists for the state. In the 1950s, dental nurses were recruited. Hospital-based dental services were extended to Sibu and Miri in 1959 and 1960. In 1961, fluoridation of the public water supply in Simanggang (now Sri Aman) was implemented.

Culture
On 8 June 1954, Radio Sarawak was set up with the technical assistance from BBC. The broadcasting service had four sections: Malay, Iban, Chinese, and English. The Iban section was broadcast from 7 pm to 8 pm daily, covering news, farming, animal husbandry, Iban folklore and epics. In 1958, School Broadcasting Service was set up under the Colombo Plan. English lessons began in 1959. Radio sets were distributed to primary schools for pupils to learn their English language. In 1960s, there were 467 participating schools in Sarawak with 850 teachers attended 11 training courses. With the formation of Malaysia in 1963, Radio Sarawak was renamed as Radio Malaysia Sarawak.

The colonial government recognised that British education and indigenous culture was influencing a new generation of Iban teachers. Thus, on 15 September 1958, the Borneo Literature Bureau was inaugurated with a charter to nurture and encourage local literature while also supporting the government in its release of documentation, particularly in technical and instructional manuscripts that were to be distributed to the indigenous peoples of Sarawak and Sabah. As well as indigenous languages, documents would also be published in English, Chinese and Malay.

After the war, artists in Sarawak especially in Kuching area chose gentle themes and social wellbeing as their drawing subjects such as scenery and nature, and indigenous characteristics such as cock fighting and traditional dances.

See also 
 Anti-cession movement of Sarawak
 Raj of Sarawak

Notes

References 

British Borneo
Lists of governors
Sarawak, Crown Colony of
1946 establishments in the British Empire
States and territories established in 1946
States and territories disestablished in 1963
1963 disestablishments in Asia
1946 establishments in Asia
1963 disestablishments in the British Empire